José Federico Ángel Francisco de Jesús Montes Alanís was a Mexican military officer who participated in the Mexican Revolution.

Biography 
He was born in San Miguel de Allende, Guanajuato on October 2, 1884. In 1905 he entered the Military Candidate School, after which he was assigned to the regiment of light artillery; he joined in 1906 as a second lieutenant of artillery. The March 18, 1909 amounted to tactical artillery lieutenant, being destined to Presidential Staff, ascending the September 12, 1911 to Captain second. But being an officer of the Federal Army, he sympathized with Maderismo, which became part of the General Staff of Francisco I. Madero.

In 1912, he participated in the campaign against Orozco and when it ended, he returned to the Presidential Staff. In 1913, he was arrested with President Francisco I. Madero, being sent to depot of commanders and officers, who participated in the campaign against the Constitutionalists in the north. In late 1913, he adheres to the constitutionalists in Nuevo Leon with the rank of major.

In February 1914, he was promoted to Lieutenant Colonel, after fighting the Huerta forces in the state of Tamaulipas. In May, he took part in the assault of Tampico; and on July 29 in making Queretaro, where he was acting governor and military commander of the place. On August 1, he participated in making Celaya, rising to colonel. Fighting later that year against Villa's forces in Tampico as a brigadier general.

On May 6, 1915, he held the governorship of Queretaro again. He fought Brig. Rodolfo Fierro in Mariscala, recovering the city of Queretaro. In 1917, he was deputy for the state of Guanajuato. In 1919, he was governor of Guanajuato. In 1920 he became head of military operations in the states of Queretaro, Guanajuato and Michoacan. He was commander of the 1st, 11th, 17th and 28th Military Zones.

He was the President of the Chamber of Deputies in 1918. In 1941, he was appointed ambassador of Mexico in Colombia. He died in Mexico City on December 1, 1950, when he was commander of the Legion of Mexican Honor.

References

 

Presidents of the Chamber of Deputies (Mexico)
People from San Miguel de Allende
Military personnel from Guanajuato
1884 births
1950 deaths
Governors of Guanajuato
Governors of Querétaro
20th-century Mexican politicians
Politicians from Guanajuato